Stigmella cerea is a moth of the family Nepticulidae. It is found in Ohio and Pennsylvania in the United States.

The wingspan is 3.5-3.6 mm.

External links
Nepticulidae of North America
A taxonomic revision of the North American species of Stigmella (Lepidoptera: Nepticulidae)

Nepticulidae
Moths of North America
Moths described in 1917